Brigitte Yaghi (born 19 November 1987) is a Lebanese pop singer and actress. She finished in fifth place in SuperStar, the Arabic version of American Idol or Pop Idol.

Early life 
Yaghi was born in Beirut, Lebanon and is that daughter of famous Lebanese singer Abdo Yaghi. At 16 she entered into SuperStar, an Arabic edition of American Idol and finished in 5th place. Following her departure from Super Star 2, Brigitte went on to release her first single, Alby W Omry

Discography

Singles
 W b2ellak shi 
 Mech Masmouh 
 Albi w 3omri 
 Ghajariya

Videography

References

External links 
 

1987 births
21st-century Lebanese women singers
Lebanese pop singers
Idols (franchise) participants
Contestants from Arabic singing competitions
Living people
Lebanese Christians
Lebanese film actresses
Lebanese television actresses